The Secret Garden is a 1949 American drama film. It is the second screen adaptation of the classic 1911 novel by Frances Hodgson Burnett. The first was a silent version released in 1919. The screenplay by Robert Ardrey was directed by Fred M. Wilcox. It centers on a young orphan who is thrust into the dark and mysterious lives of her widowed uncle and his crippled son when she comes to live with them in their isolated country house in Yorkshire, England.

The MGM film was filmed primarily in black-and-white, with the sequences set in the restored garden of the title filmed in Technicolor. The movie was Margaret O'Brien's final film for Metro-Goldwyn-Mayer. The film was released on DVD on May 7, 2013 as part of the Warner Archive Collection.

Plot
When tempestuous Mary Lennox (Margaret O'Brien), born in India to wealthy parents, is orphaned by a cholera epidemic, she is sent to live with her reclusive and embittered Uncle Archibald Craven (Herbert Marshall) and her ill-behaved, bedridden cousin Colin (Dean Stockwell), about her own age, at their desolate and decaying estate known as Misselthwaite Manor. Dickon (Brian Roper), the brother of one of the house maids, tells her of a garden secreted behind a hidden door in a vine-covered wall. When a raven unearths the key, the two enter and discover the garden is overgrown from neglect since Craven's wife died there in an accident. They decide to keep their discovery a secret, and begin to restore it to its original grandeur. Under the influence of the Secret Garden, Mary becomes less self-absorbed, Colin's health steadily improves, and Archibald's curmudgeonly personality fades away.

Cast
 Margaret O'Brien as Mary Lennox
 Herbert Marshall as Archibald Craven
 Dean Stockwell as Colin Craven
 Brian Roper as Dickon Sowerby
 Gladys Cooper as Mrs. Medlock
 Elsa Lanchester as Martha Sowerby
 Reginald Owen as Ben Weatherstaff
 Isobel Elsom as Governess
 Aubrey Mather as Dr. Griddlestone  
 George Zucco as Dr. Fortescue  
 Lowell Gilmore as British Officer  
 Billy Bevan as Barney  
 Dennis Hoey as Mr. Pitcher
 Mathew Boulton as Mr. Bromley
 Norma Varden as Nurse

Production
MGM announced the film in November 1946. It was to be a vehicle for Claude Jarman Jr and was to be directed by Clarence Brown.

Reception
According to MGM records the film earned $610,000 in the US and Canada and $383,000 overseas, resulting in a loss of $848,000.

On TCM, Margarita Landazuri writes that at the time of release, many critics "felt, as did the Variety critic, that 'the allegorical and psychological implications that have been carried over from Frances Hodgson Burnett's book are clearly for the grown-up trade. Not only that, but a good bit of the production is designed to create eerie terror that may discourage parents from letting moppets see the pic.' In this era when even the youngest 'moppets' take Harry Potter in stride, however, such criticism seems quaint, and The Secret Garden seems ahead of its time".

Leonard Maltin gives the "vividly atmospheric" film three out of four stars.

Notes

External links

 
 
 
 

1949 films
American black-and-white films
Metro-Goldwyn-Mayer films
Films about orphans
Films partially in color
Films based on The Secret Garden
Films directed by Fred M. Wilcox
Films scored by Bronisław Kaper
Films set in country houses
Films with screenplays by Robert Ardrey
1949 drama films
Films set in Yorkshire
American drama films
1940s English-language films
1940s American films